Melvina Vulah (born 21 December 1965) is a Liberian sprinter. She competed in the women's 100 metres at the 1988 Summer Olympics.

References

1965 births
Living people
Athletes (track and field) at the 1988 Summer Olympics
Liberian female sprinters
Liberian female long jumpers
Olympic athletes of Liberia
Place of birth missing (living people)